Pay Me! is a 1917 American silent drama film directed by Joe De Grasse and starring Lon Chaney, Dorothy Phillips and William Stowell. In the United States, the film is also known as The Vengeance of the West. The screenplay was written by Bess Meredith, based on a story by Joe De Grasse. This film was Universal Pictures' first "Jewel Production" release (big budget). Once considered to be a lost film, an incomplete (23-minute) print was rediscovered in the Gosfilmofond archive in Russia in 2019. A still exists showing Lon Chaney in the role of the villainous Joe Lawson.

Like many American films of the time, Pay Me! was subject to cuts by city and state film censorship boards. The Chicago Board of Censors refused to issue a permit for this film because it portrayed a story of murder, abduction, and immorality.

Plot
Hal Curtis (Clifford) and Joe Lawson (Lon Chaney), partners in a mine, have a disagreement. Lawson strangles Curtis and accidentally shoots Curtis' wife. He deserts his own wife and child and elopes with Hilda Hendricks (Selbie), a weak girl of the town. As they are leaving, they hear a baby's cry and find Curtis' little daughter in the arms of her dead mother. Hilda takes the child.

Seventeen years pass. Lawson has changed his name to White and owns a dance hall in the heart of lumber country. The men call him "Killer" White. Marta (Phillips), his partner's child, has grown to womanhood and a lumberjack named Mac Jepson has fallen in love with her. He is chagrined at finding Marta dressed in a sleazy costume, running the roulette wheel in Killer's bar. Curtis wanders into camp and, recognizing Hilda, asks where his daughter is. Hilda points her out to him and he becomes enraged, vowing vengeance on the Killer.

He is backed by the young lumberjack, who is none other than the son Lawson had abandoned. A fight follows and just before Lawson can kill Curtis, a shot rings out and Lawson drops. Hilda holds the gun. Before dying, Lawson tells Marta that she is not his daughter, and the two young people leave together.

Cast
 Lon Chaney as Joe Lawson
 J. Edwin Brown as Martin (as Eddie Brown)
 William Clifford as Hal Curtis
 Evelyn Selbie as Hilda Hendricks
 Tom Wilson as 'Mac' Jepson
 Dorothy Phillips as Marta
 Claire Du Brey as Nita
 William Stowell as Bill The Boss
 John George as Bar Patron
 Dick La Reno as Bit Role (uncredited)

Reception
"PAY ME is a strong, virile drama. It smacks of the melodramatic in its every scene. There is action in every line. The exhibitor can book this picture without a hesitancy. His patron swill be satisfied.....The climax reached is well conceived and put over with a punch.....Dorothy Phillips, who is featured, doesn't get much opportunity to impress her audience that she is really the star. As a matter of fact, Lon Chaney, William Stowell or Evelyn Selbie vie with her for honors. These do unusually good work in character roles." ---Motion Picture News

"Lon Chaney makes the bad man of the plot a little too palpable, but is forceful nevertheless." ---Moving Picture World.

See also
Lon Chaney filmography
List of rediscovered films

References

External links

1917 films
1917 drama films
1910s rediscovered films
Silent American drama films
American silent feature films
American black-and-white films
Films directed by Joseph De Grasse
Films with screenplays by Bess Meredyth
Rediscovered American films
Universal Pictures films
1910s American films